South-West Deeps (East), along with the adjoining the South-West Deeps (West), is an offshore Marine Conservation Zone (MCZ), approximately 190 km off Land's End, Cornwall. It was designated on 31 May 2019 by the Marine and Coastal Access Act 2009 and is a predominantly sandy area of the continental shelf, supporting molluscs and crustaceans living on and in mixed and coarse sediments.

Geography
Subtidal sand with areas of subtidal coarse sediment dominate the seabed and  there is an area of deep-sea bed in the south. A geological feature is the Celtic Sea Relict Sandbanks, which are among the largest and deepest shelf sand ridges in UK waters and is one of two MPAs to protect deep-sea bed habitats outside of Scotland.

The MCZ protects various species including clams, cockles, burrowing marine worms and species of flatfish such as sole and plaice.

Fishing
Greenpeace claims there is no protection for the MCZ from industrial fishing and that it is one of the most heavily fished of the Marine Protected Areas (MPA). Greenpeace UK claim that in the previous 18 months, 19,000 hours of fishing occurred in the South-West Deeps, of which 3,370 hours was bottom trawling. Of the industrial fishing vessels in the area, 53% were French, 30% Spain and 9% British. The move was criticised by the Marine Management Organisation (MMO) which said Greenpeace UK took part in an unlicenced activity which could put fishermen lives at risk and they were ″delivering accelerated protection measures within Marine Protection Areas.″

References

2019 establishments in the United Kingdom
Celtic Sea
Marine reserves of the United Kingdom
Protected areas established in 2019